The Admiral Commanding, Reserves,  was a senior Royal Navy post that existed from 1875 to 1976.

History
Before 1857 the HM Coast Guard was attached to the Customs Service for revenue duties, and was a Controller-General of the Coastguard. In January, 1869, Captain Willes was called to the Admiralty to assist the First Naval Lord in conducting the duties of the Coastguard and the Royal Naval Reserve, as well as to give general assistance in other matters, and, in October, 1870, was confirmed in office with the title of Chief of the Staff, Naval Reserves. The office of Chief of the Staff  was continued but for a brief term, and, following an Order in Council of December 12, 1874, an Admiral Superintendent of Naval Reserves was appointed to take charge of the Naval Reserve afloat. He was also given charge of Coastguard stations ashore, the Royal Naval Reserve, the Royal Naval Artillery Volunteers, and the Seamen Pensioners' Reserve. 

In 1903 responsibility for the HM Coast Guard passed to the Admiralty. On 21 May 1903 the office of Admiral Commanding Coastguard and Reserves was established, the first incumbent being Admiral Sir Ernest Rice. 

After 1903 the Admiral's duties included:
 Co-operate with the Commissioners of Customs.
 Co-operate with the Board of Trade. 
 Keep the district ships ready and efficient for mobilization and make arrangements for making up their sea-going complements.
 Manage and supervise the Royal Naval Reserve.
 Manage and supervise the Royal Naval Volunteers.
 Manage and supervise the Seamen and Marine Pensioners' Reserve.
 Organise official inspection visits to coast stations of the Coastguard, drill-ships and batteries of the Naval Reserve.
 Promote below the rank of Chief Officer
 Submit to the Board of Admiralty promotions to the rank of Chief Officer
 Superintend Her Majesty's Coastguard.
 Visit mercantile training ships and arrange training if needed.

In March 1923 responsibility for the majority of the functions of the Coast Guard was passed to the Board of Customs and Excise and the Board of Trade. 
In July 1923 the office was then re-styled Admiral Commanding, Reserves, which remained the title until the post was abolished in 1976. Successive Admirals Commanding were supported in their duties by an assistant until 1902 and then a chief of staff until 1976.

Responsibility for administering reserves then came under the Commander-in-Chief, Naval Home Command, as a dual role until 1994. From 1994-1996 the Second Sea Lord became responsible for managing reserves.

Admirals commanding
Post holders included:

Admiral Superintendent of Naval Reserves
 Vice-Admiral Sir  John W. Tarleton: January 1875-November 1876
 Vice-Admiral Augustus Phillimore: November 1876-December 1879
 Rear-Admiral Prince Alfred, Duke of Edinburgh: November 1879-November 1882
 Rear-Admiral Sir Anthony H. Hoskins: November 1882-September 1885
 Vice-Admiral John K. E. Baird: September 1885-April 1888
 Vice-Admiral Sir George Tryon: April 1888-April 1891
 Vice-Admiral Robert O'Brien FitzRoy: April 1891-April 1894
 Vice-Admiral Sir Edward H.Seymour: April 1894-May 1897
 Vice-Admiral Sir Compton E. Domvile: May 1897-May 1900
 Vice-Admiral Sir Gerard H. U. Noel: May 1900-May 1903

Admiral Commanding, Coastguard and Reserves
 Admiral Ernest Rice: May 1903-February 1905
 Admiral Sir Reginald F. H. Henderson: February 1905-December 1909
 Admiral Sir Frederick S. Inglefield: December 1909-January 1913
 Admiral Sir Arthur M. Farquhar: January 1913-June 1915
 Vice-Admiral the Hon. Sir Alexander E. Bethell: June 1915-November 1916
 Vice-Admiral the Hon. Sir Somerset A. Gough-Calthorpe: November 1916-July 1917
 Vice-Admiral Sir Cecil F. Thursby: July 1917-July 1918
 Admiral Sir Dudley R. S. de Chair: July 1918-July 1921
 Vice-Admiral Sir Morgan Singer: July 1921-July 1923

Admiral Commanding Reserves
From 1968 until 1976 this post holder co-held the title, Director-General Naval Recruiting.
 Admiral Sir Hugh H. D. Tothill: July 1923-July 1925
 Admiral Sir Lewis Clinton-Baker: July 1925-August 1927
 Vice-Admiral Sir Arthur A. M. Duff: August 1927-August 1929
 Admiral Sir John D. Kelly: August 1929-August 1931
 Vice-Admiral Henry W. Parker: August 1931 –October 1933
 Admiral Sir George K. Chetwode: October 1933-January 1936
 Vice-Admiral Sir H. J. Studholme Brownrigg: January 1936-November 1938
 Admiral Sir Noel F. Laurence: November 1938-January 1941
 Rear-Admiral Vernon S. Butler, 13 January 1941 – March 1941  (temporary)
 Vice-Admiral John G. P. Vivian: March 1941-October 1945
 Vice-Admiral Sir Charles E. Morgan: October 1945-October 1947
 Admiral Sir Wilfrid R. Patterson: October 1947-October 1949
 Vice-Admiral the Hon. Sir Guy H.E.Russell: October 1949-October 1950
 Vice-Admiral Sir William R. Slayter: October 1950-June 1952
 Vice-Admiral John A. S. Eccles: June 1952-January 1953
 Vice-Admiral Alan Scott-Moncrieff: April 1953-April 1955
 Vice-Admiral John W. Cuthbert: April 1955-January 1956
 Vice-Admiral Geoffrey Thistleton-Smith: January 1956-April 1958
 Vice-Admiral Sir William Kaye Edden: April 1958-April 1960
 Vice-Admiral Sir R. Alastair Ewing: April 1960-August 1962 
 Rear-Admiral Hugh C. Martell: August 1962-April 1965
 Rear-Admiral Geoffrey H. Carew-Hunt: April 1965-April 1968
 Rear-Admiral B. C. Godfrey Place: April 1968-May 1970 
 Rear-Admiral Ian D. McLaughlan: May 1970-July 1972
 Rear-Admiral Ian G. W. Robertson: July 1972-August 1974
 Rear-Admiral Hubert W.E. Hollins: August 1974-December 1976

Assistants/Chiefs of Staff, Reserves
Post holders included:
Assistant, Reserves:
 Captain William H. Whyte: November 1879-January 1881 
 Captain R. Gordon Douglas: January 1881-January 1883 
 Captain Lindesay Brine: January 1883-March 1886 
 Captain Charles F. Hotham: March 1886-December 1887 
 Captain Edward H. Seymour: December 1887-July 1889 
 Captain Francis Durrant: July 1889-January 1891 
 Captain Edmund C. Drummond: February 1891-April 1892 
 Captain Arthur H. Alington: April 1892-May 1894 
 Captain Arthur D. Fanshawe: May 1894-February 1897 
 Captain Robert W. Stopford: February 1897-August 1899 
 Captain Charles J. Norcock: August 1899-October 1902 
 Captain George F. King-Hall: October 1902-July 1903 
Chiefs of Staff, Reserves
 Captain George F. King-Hall: July 1903-October 1904 
 Captain John E. Bearcroft: October 1904-April 1906 
 Captain Thomas P. Walker: April 1906-March 1908 
 Captain Frederick A. Warden: March 1908-March 1909 
 Captain Richard P.F.Purefoy: March 1909-March 1911 
 Captain Mark E.F. Kerr: March 1911-November 1912 
 Captain Cresswell J. Eyres; November 1912-April 1913 
 Captain Hugh H.D. Tothill: April 1913-December 1914 
 Rear-Admiral William H. Baker-Baker: December 1914-January 1916 
 Captain Philip H. Colomb: January 1916-February 1917 
 Captain Edward L. Booty: February 1917-December 1919 
 Captain Vincent B. Molteno: December 1919 – 1921 
 Captain George Trewby: February 1920-February 1922 
 Captain Edward C. Kennedy: February 1922-March 1923 
 Captain Cecil M. Staveley: March 1923-September 1924 
 Captain Basil G. Washington: September 1924-September 1926 
 Captain Horace W. Longden: September 1926-August 1927 
 Captain Ronald Howard: August 1927-August 1929 
 Captain Charles G. Ramsey: August 1929-September 1931 
 Captain Herbert A. Forster: September 1931-September 1932 
 Captain Vernon S. Butler: September 1932-September 1934 
 Captain Frederic C. Bradley: September 1934-June 1935 
 Captain Kenneth H.L. Mackenzie: September 1935-December 1936 
 Captain Leslie H. Ashmore: December 1936-March 1938 
 Captain Humphrey B. Jacomb: March 1938-November 1939 
 Captain Vernon S. Butler: November 1939-December 1941 
 Captain Frederic N. Attwood: December 1941-June 1942  
 Commodore John M. Dick: June 1942 – 1946 
 Commodore D.A. Carey: July 1943 – 1945 
 Commodore Hugh C.C. Forsyth: 1945-1946 
 Captain Richard T. White: October 1945-January 1948 
 Captain Ian M.R. Campbell: January–December 1948 
 Captain William L.G. Adams: December 1948-November 1950 
 Captain Alan D.H. Jay: November 1950-March 1952 
 Captain Edmund N.V. Currey: March 1952-September 1954 
 Captain Archibald J.F. Milne-Home: September 1954-March 1956 
 Captain W. Frank N. Gregory-Smith: March 1956-July 1958 
 Captain Ronald de L. Brooke: July 1958-June 1960 
 Captain Herbert T. Harrel: June 1960-May 1962 
 Captain Richard E. Roe: May 1962-May 1964 
 Captain Ronald W. Forrest: May 1964-May 1966 
 Captain Michael L. Stacey: May 1966-May 1968 
 Captain Michael W.G. Fawcett: May 1968-April 1970 
 Captain Arthur Checksfield: April 1972-June 1974 
 Captain Colin N. MacEacharn: June 1974-March 1976

Offices under the Admiral Commanding Reserves

Fleet Reserve
Included:
 Captain, Fleet Reserve, Portsmouth (from 1891 until 1905): 
 Captain, Fleet Reserve, Devonport (from 1891 until 1905)
 Captain, Fleet Reserve, Medway (from 1891 until 1905)

Coast Guard Districts
Included:
 Captain, Scottish Coast Guard District (from 1903 until 1920 and from 1922 until 1923)
 Captain, Eastern Coast Guard District (from 1903 until 1920)
 Captain, Southern Coast Guard District (from 1903 until 1920
 Captain, Western Coast Guard District (from 1903 until 1920)
 Captain, North of Ireland Coast Guard District (from 1903 until 1920 and from 1922 until 1923)
 Captain, South of Ireland Coast Guard District (from 1903 until 1920)
 Captain, North of Scotland Coast Guard District (from 1920 until 1922)
 Captain, Rosyth Coast Guard District (from 1920 until 1923)
 Captain, Humber Coast Guard District (from 1920 until 1922)
 Captain, Nore Coast Guard District (from 1920 until 1923)
 Captain, Portsmouth Coast Guard District (from 1920 until 1923)
 Captain, Plymouth Coast Guard District (from 1920 until 1923)
 Captain, Irish Sea Coast Guard District (from 1920 until 1922)
 Captain, Kingstown Coast Guard District (from 1920 until 1922)
 Captain, Queenstown Coast Guard District (from 1920 until 1922)
 Captain Buncrana Coast Guard District (from 1920 until 1922)

See also
 Commander-in-Chief Fleet
 Commander-in-Chief, Portsmouth
 Commander-in-Chief, Plymouth

Notes

References 
 
 Hamilton, Sir Richard Vesey (2009). "5". Naval Administration: The Constitution, Character, and Functions of the Board of Admiralty, and of the Civil Departments it Directs original (1896). Cornell University Library. 
  Archives, The National. (1816-1947) "Records of the Coastguard". discovery.nationalarchives.gov.uk. National Archives UK.
 Harley, Simon; Lovell, Tony. (2015) "Admiral Superintendent of Naval Reserves - The Dreadnought Project". www.dreadnoughtproject.org. Harley and Lovell, England, UK.
 Harley, Simon; Lovell, Tony. (2017) "Coast Guard Service - The Dreadnought Project". www.dreadnoughtproject.org. Harley and Lovell.
 Mackie, Colin (2017). "British Armed Forces: Royal Navy Appointments from 1865" (PDF). gulabin.com. Scotland, UK.

R
Reserve forces of the United Kingdom